The Chouteau County Courthouse is a historic building in Fort Benton, Montana. It acts as the county courthouse for Chouteau County, Montana.

Prior to the construction of this courthouse, another courthouse was built for the county in 1880. It burned down in 1883, and this courthouse was built by Gus Senieur a few months later. By 2012, it was the second oldest courthouse in the state of Montana.

The courthouse was designed by Kees & Fish in the Queen Anne architectural style. It has been listed on the National Register of Historic Places since September 29, 1980.

References

Courthouses on the National Register of Historic Places in Montana
National Register of Historic Places in Chouteau County, Montana
Queen Anne architecture in Montana
Government buildings completed in 1883
1883 establishments in Montana Territory
County courthouses in Montana